Bali United Football Club is a professional football club based in Gianyar, Bali, Indonesia. The club competes in the Liga 1, the top tier of Indonesian football. Bali United emerged in 2015 as the result of the total rebranding of Indonesia Super League club Putra Samarinda (popularly known as Pusam) after its new owner relocated the club to Gianyar from Samarinda, East Kalimantan. The rebranded club retained Putra Samarinda's top-tier rights to compete in the 2015 Indonesia Super League season. It only took four years for the club to win its first top-level football championship title in the 2019. 

Bali United was the first professional football club in Indonesia and Southeast Asia, also second in Asia after Guangzhou Evergrande, to be publicly traded after its shares were offered through the Indonesia Stock Exchange on 17 June 2019. PT Bali Bintang Sejahtera Tbk released as much as 2 billion shares of the total issued and paid up capital after the initial public offering (IPO). Shares were set to go on sale for between IDR 120 and IDR 180 each, and actually became IDR 175 by the launch of the IPO on 10 June.

History

Foundation 
After the 2014 Indonesia Super League season ended, Putra Samarinda owner Harbiansyah Hanafiah decided to sell the club to businessman Pieter Tanuri who relocated the Borneo club to Gianyar, upon noticing the affluent island of Bali had no representative in the top-flight of Indonesian football after the 2013 dissolution of Indonesia Premier League (IPL) club Bali Devata FC after the controversial IPL league stopped. Tanuri, who co-owns tiremaker Multistrada Arah Sarana, chose Gianyar because Bali Devata used a mid-size stadium there called the Kapten I Wayan Dipta Stadium and the regency is strategically located at the center of the island, rather than the coasts where most foreign tourists flock. The new owner wanted the club to attract the local Balinese fans from all corners of the island and rise as the pride of Bali. To achieve that, Tanuri also totally rebranded the club to an outfit that carries the Balinese identity, starting by renaming it Bali United Pusam Football Club with colors and a crest that pay homage to the unique culture in Bali. 

Eventually, the Pusam historical tag was dropped when Bali United began to be considered as an elite club in Indonesia with the most professional management under the direction of Pieter Tanuri's brother Yabes Tanuri.

Bumpy start (2015-16) 
Bali United started its foray into top-flight Indonesian football in the 2015 season of the Indonesian Super League. However, the season was discontinued only after the rebranded club played two games amid the conflict between the Indonesian government and the country's football association PSSI that also led to a FIFA suspension on all association football activities in Indonesia from May 2015 to May 2016. 
Bali United in late 2016 finished their first full season in an unauthorized league that tried to fill the gap left by the dissolved Indonesia Super League, the 2016 Indonesia Soccer Championship A. They finished 12th out of 18 teams, a respectable result for a new club.

Liga 1 years 

In the first Liga 1 season in 2017, Bali United struggled in their first two matches, leading to the sacking of head coach Hans-Peter Schaller. His successor, Indonesian national football team legend Widodo Cahyono Putro, managed to make Bali United compete for the title and become the most productive team in the league. However, the controversial decision from organizers to use the head-to-head results in crowning the Indonesian Police club Bhayangkara despite it having the same exact points with Bali United dashed the hopes of a fairy-tale ending.

Being runner-up of the 2017 season, Bali United in 2018 competed in an AFC competition for the first time in their history. The club made their debut in the AFC Champions League on 16 January 2018 with a 3–1 win over Tampines Rovers in the preliminary stage round 1, but failed to reach the group stage after losing 1–2 to Chiangrai United in the preliminary stage round 2. 
They also debuted in the AFC Cup where they were eliminated in the group stage after only finishing fourth. 
Their bad streak continued in the league. A controversy occurred when coach Widodo resigned the day before a key match against Persija, triggering supporters to light flares throughout the match as a symbol of protest against the management. They finished the 2018 season in the 11th spot.

In another twist, Widodo was replaced by the triumphant Persija coach in that controversial match, Brazilian Stefano Cugurra, who led Persija to win the 2018 title. In his first season at Bali United, Cugurra took the club to its first Liga 1 title, cementing the club's elite status in Indonesian football. After a decent start in defending its title in the 2020 season, Bali United faced another mid-competition stop after the league was suspended due to the COVID-19 pandemic in March 2020.

Colours and badge 
Since its 2015 launch, Bali United have always played in red when at home and white for most away matches, with a black third kit. The colours are based on the Balinese Hinduism sacred tri-color, Tridatu, which then led to its nickname Serdadu Tridatu (Tridatu Warriors).

The club's crest shows the word Bali United on top, with the abbreviation of the club's name (BU) and the black-and-white background that is identical to the checkered poleng cloth, which in Bali symbolizes Rwa Bhineda or the two opposites that balance the universe. The strong usage of such symbolisms partly explains why Bali United has die-hard fans in the predominantly Hindu island of Bali despite its young age.

Kit manufacturers and sponsors 
Since the club's foundation, Bali United's kit was self-manufactured. The reason was that by collaborating with an apparel company, the price of the team jersey would soar out of reach from the Balinese masses that support the club. From a business standpoint, it was feared that it could disrupt merchandise sales as no other club in Indonesia had better success in selling authentic jerseys than professional managed Bali United. But after five years, in 2021, their kit will be provided by Mills. Their kit is always filled with multiple sponsors, which make their kit dubbed as a racing jersey. Multistrada Arah Sarana products (Corsa and Achilles tires), Indofood, and YCAB Foundation are the sponsors that always appear on the jersey to this day. Indofood product Indomie was once the sole jersey sponsor of Bali United in the AFC competition in 2018.

Stadiums 

Kapten I Wayan Dipta Stadium in Gianyar, is on a 20-year lease from government of Gianyar Regency. It has been Bali United's home base since the club was formed. Before moving to the stadium, Bali United spent in excess of IDR 5 billion to renovate it to meet the standard of Indonesia Super League. They added a new lighting system, upgraded the dressing rooms, repainted some parts of the stadium, repaired the toilets and upgraded other facilities. The inaugural match for Bali United at their new stadium was a 0–1 defeat over Persib in a friendly match on 3 March 2015. Bali United has continued to upgrade the facility, including adding a store, cafe, and playland around the stadium. They also did some renovations for the Asian competition in 2018 to meet the standard of the AFC.

Supporters and media 
A typical Bali United supporter is called Semeton Dewata; Semeton meaning brother and Dewata meaning Bali's nickname, Island of Gods. Lady Dewata is the name for their female supporters. Semeton Dewata ultras usually fill the east stand of Kapten I Wayan Dipta Stadium. There are other, more exclusive supporter groups. Northsideboys 12 fill the north stand while Basudewa Curva Sud fill the south stand.

Bali United has three mascots representing the north, east, and south tribunes of Kapten I Wayan Dipta Stadium. Jalbo, stands for Jalak Boys and resembles a Jalak Bali bird (Bali myna), is the mascot of the Northsideboys 12. The east tribune is represented by Cebol (Celuluk Bola) that takes shape of a Celuluk, a mythological creature in Bali folklore. Cebol is a mascot of Semeton Dewata. Basudewa Curva Sud in 2019 introduced a mascot to represent the south tribune called Wabol, which stands for Waraha Bola. Wabol takes shape of Varaha, a Dashavatara of the Hindu god Vishnu.

The song "Rasa Bangga", or "Pride" in English, composed and recorded by Bali band The Resistance, is the club's anthem and has been sung by all the fans, players, and staff of Bali United after any home or away game since the 2017 season.

Bali United has an online-streaming-based TV channel that airs in YouTube called Bali Utd TV, which started broadcasting on 19 October 2016. It features news updates, player and staff interviews, match highlights (of the first team and the youth squad), and other themed programs.

On 20 May 2017, Bali United officially launched the team's mobile app to connect with the fans. Bali United CEO Yabes Tanuri said the launch of the application is based on the awareness of the importance of technology for marketing development and interaction of a club with its supporters. By using the mobile apps, the supporters can easily access all sorts of team information.

Bali United also owns their own radio station, Bali United FM. With a tagline your sportainment station, they broadcast Bali United games and also latest information about Bali United that airs on 106,9 FM in Bali. Bali United FM is operating in the third floor of Bali United's office.

Players

Current squad

Other players under contract

Youth teams 

Players to have featured in a first-team matchday squad for Bali United.

Women's team 

Bali United also operate a women's football team. They have been affiliated to the men's team since 2019 and were one of the 10 inaugural teams of the Liga 1 Putri.

Club officials

Corporate hierarchy

Coaching staff

Head coach's history 
Head Coach by years (2014–present)

Honours

Domestic

League 
 Liga 1
 Winners (2): 2019, 2021–22
 Runners-up (1): 2017

Friendly 
 Trofeo Bali Celebest
 Winners (1): 2016
 Trofeo Persija
 Runners-up (1): 2016
 Bali Island Cup (including Trofeo format)
 Winners (1): 2017
 Indonesia President's Cup
 Runners-up (1): 2018

Statistics

Season by season record 

Notes:

 PR = Preliminary round
 PR1 = Preliminary round 1
 PR2 = Preliminary round 2
 PO = Play-off round
 GS = Group stage

 1R = First round
 2R = Second round
 R32 = Round of 32
 R16 = Round of 16

 QF = Quarter-finals
 SF = Semi-finals
 ZSF = Zonal semi-finals
 ZF = Zonal final

 ISF = Inter-zone play-off semi-finals
 IF = Inter-zone play-off final
 R/U = Runners-up
 W = Winners

AFC club competitions record 

Notes: Bali United score are listed first.

Other departments

eSports 
In February 2019, Bali United opened an eSports department named Island of Gods (IOG), becoming the first professional football club in Indonesia to do so. They have five divisions so far, such as: Mobile Legends: Bang Bang, PUBG Mobile, Free Fire, FIFA, and Pro Evolution Soccer. In Free Fire Asia Invitational (FFAI) 2019 tournament, they managed to become champions after getting the highest points with 2,345 points.

References

External links 
  
 

 
Bali United
Bali United
Bali United
Bali United
Bali United
Bali United
Bali United